Via Paolo Fabbri 43 is an album by Italian singer-songwriter Francesco Guccini. It was released in 1976 by EMI Italiana, and was Guccini's best-selling title. The album takes its title from the complete address where Guccini lived at the time.

It contains one of Guccini's most famous songs, "L'avvelenata" ("The poisonous"), a long ballad in which he ridicules his critics (including Riccardo Bertoncelli, with whom Guccini later reconciled), as well as several aspects of Italian culture in the 1970s; some of these elements are also present in the title track, but with a more ironic tone. "Piccola storia ignobile" is a song about an abortion case.

Track listing 

"Piccola storia ignobile" (6:55)
"Canzone di notte n. 2" (4:59)
"L'avvelenata"  (4:41)
"Via Paolo Fabbri 43" (8:15)
"Canzone quasi d'amore" (4:13)
"Il pensionato" (4:26)

References

1976 albums
Francesco Guccini albums
Italian-language albums